The year 715 BC was a year of the pre-Julian Roman calendar. In the Roman Empire, it was known as year 39 Ab urbe condita . The denomination 715 BC for this year has been used since the early medieval period, when the Anno Domini calendar era became the prevalent method in Europe for naming years.

Events
 Egypt: End of Twenty-fourth Dynasty
 Start of the reign of Roman King Numa Pompilius

Births

Deaths
 Ahaz, king of Judah (or 716 BC)

References

710s BC